4th Legion may refer to:

Legio IV Macedonica founded in 48 BC
Legio IV Scythica founded c. 42 BC by the general Mark Antony  
Legio IV Flavia Felix founded in AD 70 by the emperor Vespasian from the ashes of the Legio IV Macedonica
Legio IV Martia
Legio IV Italica founded in AD 231 by emperor Alexander Severus